Measuring attractiveness through a categorical-based evaluation technique (MACBETH) is a  multiple-criteria decision analysis (MCDA) method that evaluates options against multiple criteria.

MACBETH was designed by Carlos António Bana e Costa, from the University of Lisbon with Professor Jean-Claude Vansnick and Dr. Jean-Marie De Corte, from the Université de Mons.

The key distinction between MACBETH and other MCDA methods is that MACBETH needs only qualitative judgements about the difference of attractiveness between two elements at a time.  It can then generate numerical scores for the options in each criterion and to weight the criteria. 

The seven MACBETH semantic categories are: no, very weak, weak, moderate, strong, very strong, and extreme difference of attractiveness.

Uses and applications

MACBETH has been extensively applied in various evaluation contexts, namely:

Agriculture, manufacturing, and services
 Finance
 Information systems
 Performance measurement
 Production & service planning
 Quality management
 R&D project selection
 Risk management
 Strategy & resource allocation
 Supply chain and logistics

Energy
 Project prioritization and selection
 Technology choice

Environment
 Landscape management
 Climate change
 Risk management
 Sustainable development
 Water resource management

Medical
 Medical

Military
 Military

Public sector
 Conflict analysis and management
 Project prioritization & resource allocation
 Procurement
 Project prioritization & resource allocation
 Strategic planning & development

Others
 Human resource management
 Job selection
 Sports

Decision support systems

Several decision support systems implement the MACBETH approach:
 Decision-making software 
 M-MACBETH, 
 mini-MACBETH (within HIVIEW3)
 CA-MACBETH

External links 

 Carlos António Bana e Costa
 CA-MACBETH
 M-MACBETH
 mini-MACBETH (within HIVIEW3)

References

Multiple-criteria decision analysis
Sampling (statistics)
Decision analysis
Design of experiments
Actuarial science
Single-equation methods (econometrics)
Regression models
Mathematical and quantitative methods (economics)
Mathematical optimization
Medical statistics
Clinical trials
Epidemiology
Utility